Bangladesh is a riverine country located in South Asia with a coastline of 580 km (360 mi) on the northern littoral of the Bay of Bengal. The delta plain of the Ganges (Padma), Brahmaputra (Jamuna), and Meghna Rivers and their tributaries occupy 79 percent of the country.

Sea ports

Inland ports

References

Foreign trade of Bangladesh